Warnie is an Australian television miniseries based on the life of cricketer Shane Warne, scheduled to air in 2023.

Cast 
The cast for the two-part drama was announced Wednesday, November 9th, 2022. 

Alex Williams as Shane Warne
Marny Kennedy as Simone Callahan 
Anthony Hayes (actor) 
Shanti Kali as Liz Hurley 
Andrew Blackman
Daniel Cosgrove as Michael Clarke
Jeremy Stanford
Jacquie Brennan as Brigitte Warne
Tom Stokes as Steve Waugh
Ben Hall

Reception
Hours after the series was announced, Shane Warne’s eldest daughter, Brooke Warne, accused Nine of being “beyond disrespectful” and “insensitive” to greenlight the series just a few months after her father's death, and also claiming that “it’s just a ratings ploy”.

The miniseries went into production after Channel 9 and ScreenTime had talks with the family. The family later lent their support to the production, closely collaborating with the family.

References

Biographical television series
Nine Network original programming
Shane Warne
Upcoming television series
2020s Australian television miniseries
2023 Australian television series debuts